Gawar may refer to:

 Yüksekova, known in Syriac as Gawar, a city in Turkey
 Gawar language, and Afro-Asiatic language of Cameroon

See also 
 Gavar, a town in Armenia
 Gaur (disambiguation)
 Gawar-Bati language, an Indo-Aryan language of Pakistan